Heptasteornis is the name given to a potentially dubious genus of alvarezsaurid dinosaur from the Late Cretaceous. The type (and only known) species is Heptasteornis andrewsi, described as a presumed gigantic prehistoric owl in 1975. It was previously included in Elopteryx nopcsai and indeed the holotypes of both were believed to be from the same individual as they were discovered, and initially were assigned the same specimen number. This appears to be in error however (see below).

The material was discovered in Romania by Franz Nopcsa, in the late Maastrichtian Sânpetru Formation (Rognacian faunal stage, deposited c. 68 - 66 million years ago) of the Haţeg Basin in Transylvania. The scientific name means "C.W. Andrews' Transylvanian bird", after the namer of Elopteryx, and Ancient Greek hepta (ἑπτά) "seven" + asty (άστυ) "city" + ornis (όρνις) "bird"; the Latin septum urbium or the German Siebenbürgen - meaning "seven cities" or "seven castles" - were common names for the Transylvanian region throughout the centuries.
 
The material was originally limited to a mere two broken distal tibiotarsi, BMNH A4359 and A1528. The taxonomic status and systematic placement of these bones was much disputed and they were often considered junior synonyms of Bradycneme or Elopteryx. Given the fragmentary nature of the fossils, little could be resolved and Heptasteornis was (and still is) considered a nomen dubium by many.

However, more recently the bones were reassessed as an alvarezsaurid, the first to be known from Europe, and this theory, originally proposed in 1988, has since withstood further scrutiny. Bradycneme and Elopteryx on the other hand seem to be more advanced maniraptoran theropods.

Thus, of those three enigmatic Romanian theropods the one most explicitly named a "bird" in its scientific name is almost certainly the one most distantly related to birds.

References

Bibliography 
  (1913): On some bird remains from the Upper Cretaceous of Transylvania. Geological Magazine 5: 193–196.
  (1998): Small theropods from the Late Cretaceous of the Hateg Basin (western Romania) - an unexpected diversity at the top of the food chain. Oryctos 1: 87–104.
  (1975): The Bradycnemidae, a new family of owls from the Upper Cretaceous of Romania. Palaeontology 18(3): 563–570. PDF fulltext
  (1992): The first record of dromaeosaurid dinosaurs (Saurischia, Theropoda) in the Maastrichtian of southern Europe: palaeobiogeographical implications. Bulletin de la Société géologique de la France 163(3): 337–343.
  (2004): Heptasteornis was no ornithomimid, troodontid, dromaeosaurid or owl: the first alvarezsaurid (Dinosauria: Theropoda) from Europe. Neues Jahrbuch für Geologie und Paläontologie - Monatshefte 7: 385–401.
  (1988): Predatory Dinosaurs of the World. New York, Simon & Schuster. 
  (1991): The dinosaurs of Transylvania. National Geographic Research and Exploration 7(2): 196–215. PDF fulltext

Alvarezsaurids
Maastrichtian life
Late Cretaceous dinosaurs of Europe
Cretaceous Romania
Fossils of Romania
Fossil taxa described in 1975
Taxa named by Colin Harrison
Taxa named by Cyril Walker
Nomina dubia